Andrea Bieger (born 8 October 1959) is a German former gymnast. She competed in two events, team and individual all around, at the 1976 Summer Olympics.

References

External links
 

1959 births
Living people
German female artistic gymnasts
Olympic gymnasts of West Germany
Gymnasts at the 1976 Summer Olympics
Sportspeople from Kiel